is a Japanese professional baseball catcher and coach. He played in Nippon Professional Baseball from 1991 to 2010. He was a catching coach for the Tokyo Yakult Swallows.

References 

1971 births
Living people
People from Narashino
Baseball people from Chiba Prefecture
Japanese baseball players
Nippon Professional Baseball catchers
Yakult Swallows players
Nippon Ham Fighters players
Hanshin Tigers players
Yokohama BayStars players
Japanese baseball coaches
Nippon Professional Baseball coaches